Sauyr Zhotasy (Sauyr jotasy), also known as Muz Tau, at 3,840 m is the highest point in the Saur Range and of the entire Saur-Tarbagatai mountain system, part of the Tien Shan, on the border between Kazakhstan and China. Despite its low elevation, it is well separated from higher ranges in its area (the Saur-Tarbagatai System being separated from the Altai Mountains by the Irtysh River valley, and from the Dzungarian Alatau, by the Dzungarian Gate); it is therefore ranked highly by topographic prominence.

There have been two documented ascents to sub-summits of Sauyr Zhotasy, occurring in 2017 and 2018 by Ed Hannam and his team, but no official ascents to the main summit have been recorded.

See also
 List of Ultras of Central Asia

References

External links
 Sauyr Zhotasy on Peakbagger

Mountains of Xinjiang
Mountains of Kazakhstan
International mountains of Asia
China–Kazakhstan border